Tania Tallie (born 7 December 1975) is a South African judoka. She competed in the women's extra-lightweight event at the 2000 Summer Olympics.

References

1975 births
Living people
South African female judoka
Olympic judoka of South Africa
Judoka at the 2000 Summer Olympics
Sportspeople from Cape Town
African Games medalists in judo
Competitors at the 1999 All-Africa Games
African Games bronze medalists for South Africa